A blue book or bluebook is an almanac, buyer's guide or other compilation of statistics and information. The term dates back to the 15th century, when large blue velvet-covered books were used for record-keeping by the Parliament of England.  The Oxford English Dictionary first records such a usage in 1633.
The term has a variety of other meanings.

Academia and education
 The Yale College Programs of Study, referred to as the Blue Book
 Blue book exam, a type of test involving writing an essay, typically into a pamphlet – traditionally blue colored – called a "blue book"
 Blue and Brown Books, the Blue Book of Lecture Notes for 1933-1934 for Ludwig Wittgenstein lectures

Construction

 The Blue Book of Building and Construction, was a yellow pages-like buyers guide of company information targeted towards commercial construction, first published in 1913.  The guide contains information on architects, contractors, manufacturers, suppliers, vendors, and other companies relevant to the commercial bidding and build process. The hardbound book was retired in 2016 and subsequently replaced by a bi-annual regional magazine called the Who's Who in Building and Construction. The prior content of the hard bound book is now completely online and called The Blue Book Network.  The company which publishes the information is Jefferson Valley, New York-based Contractor's Register.

Computing and technology
Blue Book (CD standard), the name of one format from the Rainbow Book standards for compact discs, defining the Enhanced CD standard
Blue Book (CCITT), a set of telecommunications recommendations issued by the International Telecommunication Union Standardisation Sector in 1988
A common name of the book Smalltalk-80: The Language and its Implementation, and any virtual machine implementation based on Smalltalk
Blue Book protocol, the file transfer protocol of the Coloured Book protocols
The Java Virtual Machine specification
Blue Books, spacecraft data and telemetry recommendations made by the Consultative Committee for Space Data Systems
Ingo Wegener's Blue Book, an influential textbook in circuit complexity formally titled The Complexity of Boolean Functions (1987)

Government and finance

In the Traineeship scheme of the European Commission, internship candidates who pass a preselection are added to a Blue Book, from which the final successful candidates are chosen
 The publications of the European Central Bank describing the main payment and securities settlement systems in the EU Member States.
 A publication of the United Nations Protocol and Liaison Service containing listings relating to Permanent Missions to the United Nations.
 Blue pages, a government telephone directory, published either as part of books for white pages or yellow pages, or separately in a blue book

United Kingdom 
 British Blue Books, collections of diplomatic correspondence and government documents for informing or influencing the public or Parliament
 Colonial Blue Books, yearly collection of details wide range of matters from each colonial governor in the British Empire beginning in 1822
 Blue Book (Office for National Statistics), published annually by the Office for National Statistics; contains the estimates of the domestic and national product, income and expenditure for the United Kingdom
 Any official report in the UK of Parliament or the Privy Council, which in the 19th and early 20th centuries were standardly issued in a dark blue paper cover
 United Kingdom National Accounts – "The Blue Book", of economic activity in the United Kingdom
 "Treason of the Blue Books", "Treachery of the Blue Books" or simply the "Blue Books" - names used for the 1847 Reports of the Commissioners of Inquiry into the State of Education in Wales
 A weekly digest of signals intelligence reports by the British intelligence agency GCHQ
 "The Blue Book", genocide scholars' nickname for The Treatment of Armenians in the Ottoman Empire, 1915–1916
The Blue Book, Political Truth or Historical Fact, a 2009 documentary film about this report

United States 

 Blue Book (FCC), a nickname for a report on Public Service Responsibility of Broadcast Licensees issued on March 7, 1946 by the Federal Communications Commission of the United States
 Blue Book (United States Marine Corps), a bulletin listing the lineal precedence and seniority of Marine Corps officers
 Project Blue Book, a U.S. Air Force study on UFOs
 Regulations for the Order and Discipline of the Troops of the United States, a Revolutionary War drill manual written by Baron von Steuben for the Continental Army, colloquially referred to as the Blue Book
 Various information registers from U.S. state governments:
 Official Manual State of Missouri ("Missouri Blue Book")
 Oregon Blue Book
 Tennessee Blue Book
 Wisconsin Blue Book
 Blue Book of Denver society, first called the Who's Who in Denver Society by Louise Sneed Hill
 The Blue Book of the John Birch Society, a transcript of the founding meeting of the John Birch Society

Transportation 
 Aircraft bluebook, a digest that covers the price and condition of used general aviation aircraft in the U.S; the Aircraft Bluebook Rating Scale (or "Bluebook scale") is used in the aviation industry to rate the condition of used aircraft.
 Automobile Blue Book, a route guide to American intercity transportation published between 1901 and 1929.
 Kelley Blue Book, an automotive appraisal guide from the company of the same name; it is the United States' largest automotive vehicle valuation company.

Other publications 
 The Bluebook: A Uniform System of Citation, a style guide that prescribes the most widely used legal citation system in the United States
 One of the Blue and Brown Books, sets of notes taken during lectures conducted by the philosopher Ludwig Wittgenstein between 1933 and 1935 also called Preliminary Studies for the "Philosophical Investigations"
 Blue Book (magazine), published from 1905 to 1975
 Blue Book (racing), a publication of The Jockey Club
 Little Blue Books and Big Blue Books, a series of 20th century paperback books by the Haldeman-Julius Publishing Company
 The Wee Blue Book, a Scottish political pro-independence publication
 In medicine, the WHO/IARC Classification of Tumors blue book series, published by the International Agency for Research on Cancer and the World Health Organization
 The Yearbook of the Motor Sports Association, contains rules for motor sports run under the MSA.

 IUPAC Blue Book, Nomenclature of Organic Chemistry

 The Blue Book of Stationery

See also 
Black Book (disambiguation)
Blue booking, a term from role-playing games for events which happen away from the game itself
Green Book (disambiguation)
Green paper
Grey literature
Persuasive writing
Red Book (disambiguation)
White paper

References

External links
State Blue Books. American Library Association's Government Documents Roundtable (GODORT)

Almanacs
Grey literature